Ondřej Sehnal (born 10 October 1997) is a Czech professional basketball player for Löwen Braunschweig of the Basketball Bundesliga.

Professional career
Sehnal played for USK Praha of the Czech National Basketball League from 2014 to 2021.

On August 9, 2021, he has signed with Löwen Braunschweig of the Basketball Bundesliga.

National team
Sehnal has been a member of the Czech national basketball team. 
At a EuroBasket 2022 qualification game against Denmark, Sehnal scored 10 points while his coach Ronen Ginzburg assigned Sehnal with special defense assignments against the opponent's top players.

Personal life
Sehnal states that he grew up admiring Miloš Teodosić.

References

External links
FIBA profile
Profile at Eurobasket.com
Profile at Czech National Basketball League

1997 births
Living people
Basketball Löwen Braunschweig players
Basketball players at the 2020 Summer Olympics
Czech men's basketball players
Olympic basketball players of the Czech Republic
Point guards
Sportspeople from Prague
USK Praha players